The Birdman Atlas is a single-seat, high wing, single engine in pusher configuration, ultralight aircraft that was based upon the Eipper Quicksilver design.

Development
The Atlas was introduced to the marketplace in 1980. Production was curtailed in about 1983 as the company concentrated on producing the newer Birdman WT-11 Chinook instead.

The Atlas was a development of the Quicksilver and as such incorporated many of the Quicksilver's features, such as a 6061-T6 aluminum-framed, single-surface Dacron-covered, wire-braced high wing, with the ground wires suspended from a kingpost. The fuselage structure was also built from 6061-T6 aluminum tube.

The early Atlas XC variants used weight shift for control supplemented with a rudder, whereas the later 3-A versions (for 3-Axis) utilized a conventional control system with elevator and rudder, and spoilers for roll control.

Variants
Atlas 215 XC
Foot-launchable single place ultralight powered by a  215 cc single cylinder Cuyuna 215 engine. Control system is weight shift, plus rudder. Landing gear includes a shimmy-damped, shock-absorbing tailwheel unit. Available in kit form.
Atlas 250 XC
Foot-launchable single place ultralight powered by a  250 cc twin cylinder Rotax engine. Control system is weight shift, plus rudder. Landing gear includes a shimmy-damped, shock-absorbing tailwheel unit. Available in kit form.
Atlas 215 3-A
Non-foot-launchable single place ultralight powered by a  215 cc single cylinder Cuyuna 215 engine. Conventional three-axis control system utilizing spoilers for roll-control. Seat is adjustable fore and aft for balance. Due to company concerns about rigging requirements it was only supplied as a completed aircraft.
Atlas 250 3-A
Non-foot-launchable single place ultralight powered by a  250 cc twin cylinder Rotax engine. Conventional three-axis control system utilizing spoilers for roll-control. Due to company concerns about rigging requirements it was only supplied as a completed aircraft.

Specifications (Atlas 215 3-A)

See also

References

1980s Canadian ultralight aircraft